Hoseynabad (also Romanized as Ḩoseynābād) is a village in Sabzdasht Rural District, in the Central District of Bafq County, Yazd Province, Iran. At the 2006 census, its population was 20, in 10 families.

References 

Populated places in Bafq County